Carasco is a comune (municipality) in the Metropolitan City of Genoa in the Italian region Liguria, located about  east of Genoa in the Val Fontanabuona.

Carasco borders the following municipalities: Chiavari, Cogorno, Leivi, Mezzanego, Ne, San Colombano Certénoli.

References

Cities and towns in Liguria